Åsunn Lyngedal (born 17 July 1968) is a Norwegian politician. 

She was elected representative to the Storting for the period 2017–2021 for the Labour Party.

References

1968 births
Living people
Labour Party (Norway) politicians
Women members of the Storting
Nordland politicians